Albert James Anderson (c. 1914 – January 15, 1994) was a Canadian football administrator who was general manager of the Edmonton Eskimos from 1947 to 1956. He won three Grey Cups with them in 1954, 1955 and 1956. Anderson later worked with the Edmonton Exhibition Association and Northlands.

References

1910s births
1994 deaths
Edmonton Elks general managers
Canadian football people from Edmonton
Place of birth missing